Heteracris trimaculata, also known as the three-spotted forest grasshopper, is a species of grasshopper in the family Acrididae. The species is endemic to the Usambara Mountains in Tanzania.

References

Insects described in 1991
Acrididae